The 2014 Maldives FA Cup was the 27th edition of the Maldives FA Cup.

Quarter-finals

Semi-finals

Third-place play-off

Final

References

External links
 Maldives FA Cup Official page at Facebook

Maldives FA Cup seasons
FA Cup